Marcus Peixoto (born 9 March 1984) is an Indian professional footballer who last played as a defender for Dempo S.C. in the I-League.

Career

Dempo
Peixoto had been with I-League side Dempo S.C. since at least 2008.

On 1 June 2013 it was announced that Peixoto had been released from Dempo.

References

External links 
 

1984 births
Living people
People from South Goa district
Footballers from Goa
I-League players
Association football defenders
Indian footballers
Dempo SC players